Pype Hayes Park is one of the larger parks in Birmingham, England. The park is in Erdington Constituency and straddles the boundary between Pype Hayes and Erdington (now Tyburn ward. It covers B72 and B24.  The northern boundary of the park is the traditional boundary between Erdington and Sutton Coldfield.  Pype Hayes Park reaches from the corner where Eachelhurst Road joins Chester Road to a point close to Park Close off Chester Road and in places borders Pitts Farm estate. It also leads to Berwood Farm Road and Welwyndale Road.

The main park entrance is on Chester Road and by that entrance is the lodge where the head gardener lives, like Pype Hayes Hall this is a grade II listed building.  To the left of the main drive to Pype Hayes Hall is a car parking area and further on towards Pype Hayes Hall is a children’s play area with swings and other attractions.  Returning to the main drive one can get to the front entrance of Pype Hayes Hall and round there are gardens.  The older gardens have a traditional layout with many fairly straight flower beds and dwarf yew hedges.  To the north of the traditional garden is a modern garden planted for the millennium. A fountain that was the centrepiece of this garden was vandalised and has been left unrepaired for several years.

To the west of the gardens is a fish pond which is also a duck pond with a duck island, many species of water birds can be found there, notably Mallard ducks, Canada geese and frequently a pair of resident mute swan.

By the corner where Chester Road meets Eachelhurst Road is the area where the annual bonfire and Funfair are held on 5 November, fairs are also held there at other times of the year.

To the north of the section above is mown grass with young trees planted in groups and mature trees, later the land starts to slope downwards to a valley where Plants Brook flows, the brook was culverted during the 1960s due to flooding.  Many young trees have been planted in the flattish area round Plants Brook which is near the border of the park.

After World War II  single-storey prefabricated buildings were built round the park between Chester Road and Eachelhurst Road; each prefab had a small garden to the front and another small garden to the rear.  Several decades later these homes were removed, giving a better view of the park and the Manor house but if visitors to the park look closely there is still a level area where the prefabs once stood.

During the 1990s there was a problem with travellers who parked caravans without permission, but this was prevented by erecting metal railings round the part of the perimeter of the park where there are no houses, round the car park, along the main driveway, these railings separate areas where vehicles are permitted from areas where vehicles are not permitted.  There are gates in these railings which are unlocked for permitted vehicles, for example when the funfair arrives.

External links
 
 Pype Hayes Park, Erdington

Geography of Birmingham, West Midlands
Erdington
History of Birmingham, West Midlands
Parks and open spaces in Birmingham, West Midlands